Harald Kujat (born 1 March 1942) is a retired German General of the Luftwaffe. He served as Chief of Staff of the German armed forces, the Bundeswehr, from 2000 to 2002, and as Chairman of the NATO Military Committee from 2002 to 2005.

Biography 
Kujat was born in Mielke, Reichsgau Wartheland (today Poland) to a farmer who died as a soldier in World War II. His mother with her four children fled the advancing Red Army at the end of World War II to Kiel. After passing his Abitur Kujat volunteered for the Luftwaffe in 1959. In 1965 he was promoted to lieutenant and became the staff officer of the German secretary of defense Georg Leber in 1972–75. Kujat passed the general staff training at the Führungsakademie der Bundeswehr (Hamburg) in 1975–77 and served as the Staff Officer of Hans Apel in 1977. The same year he took over a department at the Luftwaffenunterstützungsgruppenkommando Nord at Münster and held several positions at the Department of Defense and the German Chancellery in Bonn. In 1985 Kujat became the commanding officer of II. Bataillon, Luftwaffenausbildungsregiment 1 in Appen near Pinneberg.

In 1988 Kujat passed the 72nd course of the NATO Defense College in Rome and was promoted an Oberst in October 1988. In 1989 he became a referent of the German Representative at the Chairman of the Military Committee in Brussels, Branch Chief (Nuclear and Global Arms Control) at the Federal Ministry of Defence in 1990 and Chief of Staff and Deputy German Military Representative to the NATO Military Committee and the Western European Union, Brussels, in 1992–95.

In 1996 Kujat became the Director of the IFOR Co-ordination Centre (ICC), Supreme Headquarters Allied Powers Europe (SHAPE), Mons, Belgium and in October Deputy Director of the NATO International Military Staff in Brussels.

On 10 November 1998 Kujat, now a Generalleutnant, became the Director Policy and Advisory Staff to Rudolf Scharping, the German Minister of Defence, Berlin and on 1 June 2000 the Chief of Staff of the Federal Forces. In 2002 Kujat became the Chairman of the NATO Military Committee until his retirement on 17 June 2005.

Kujat currently serves as the Chair of the Advisory Council of the Network Centric Operations Industry Consortium.

He is married and has three children.

Since July 2016, Kujat is a member of the Supervisory Board of the Berlin-based Research Institute 'Dialogue of Civilizations' (DOC), allegedly financed by Vladimir Yakunin, until 2015 CEO of the Russian Railways and by some sources considered a member of the Russian president Vladimir Putin's inner circle.

By some conservative German media (Bild-Zeitung, Die Welt) Kujat was criticized for his pro-Russian views in German TV talk shows, allegedly being considered with misgiving by the German Federal Government.

Awards and decorations
 Federal Cross of Merit
 Badge of Honour of the Bundeswehr in Gold
 Medal of the Senate of Hamburg (flood of 1962)
 Commander of the Legion of Honour (France)
 NATO Meritorious Service Medal
 Legion of Merit (United States)
 Xirka Ġieħ ir-Repubblika (Malta)
 Commander's Cross of Merit (Poland)
 Order of the Cross of the Eagle, 1 Class (Estonia)
 Medal "For strengthening of brotherhood of arms" (Russian Federation Ministry of Defence)
 Gold Medal of the Polish Armed Forces
 Commander's Cross of the Order of Merit of the Republic of Hungary, Military Division
 Grand Cordon of the Order of Leopold (Belgium)

References

External links 

1942 births
Living people
People from West Prussia
Generals of the German Air Force
Commanders Crosses of the Order of Merit of the Federal Republic of Germany
Recipients of the Military Order of the Cross of the Eagle, Class I
Recipients of the Badge of Honour of the Bundeswehr
Commandeurs of the Légion d'honneur
Recipients of the NATO Meritorious Service Medal
Foreign recipients of the Legion of Merit
Commander's Crosses of the Order of Merit of the Republic of Hungary (military)
Inspectors General of the Bundeswehr
NATO military personnel
German Air Force pilots